Nam Theun (also known as Khading), is a river in Laos, in Khammouane and Bolikhamsai Provinces. "Nam Theun" is also three options for large dams on the same river, called Nam Theun 1, Nam Theun 1-2 and Nam Theun 2. Nam Theun 2, which was considered the most economic of the three options, is in operation.

Part of the river corridor is a 62,000 hectare national preserve that is one of the protected areas of Laos.

Notes

External links
 Rivers in Laos

Rivers of Laos
Tributaries of the Mekong River